Documentary evidence is any evidence that is, or can be, introduced at a trial in the form of documents, as distinguished from oral testimony. Documentary evidence is most widely understood to refer to writings on paper (such as an invoice, a contract or a will), but the term can also apply to any media by which information can be preserved, such as photographs; a medium that needs a mechanical device to be viewed, such as a tape recording or film; and a printed form of digital evidence, such as emails or spreadsheets.

Normally, before documentary evidence is admissible as evidence, it must be proved by other evidence from a witness that the document is genuine, called "laying a foundation".

Documentary v. physical evidence
A piece of evidence is not documentary evidence if it is presented for some purpose other than the examination of the contents of the document. For example, if a blood-spattered letter is introduced solely to show that the defendant stabbed the author of the letter from behind as it was being written, then the evidence is physical evidence, not documentary evidence. However, a film of the murder taking place would be documentary evidence (just as a written description of the event from an eyewitness). If the content of that same letter is then introduced to show the motive for the murder, then the evidence would be both physical and documentary.

Authentication
Documentary evidence is subject to specific forms of authentication, usually through the testimony of an eyewitness to the execution of the document, or to the testimony of a witness able to identify the handwriting of the purported author. Documentary evidence is also subject to the best evidence rule, which requires that the original document be produced unless there is a good reason not to do so.

References
Peter Murphy. "Documentary Evidence". Murphy on Evidence. Tenth Edition. Oxford University Press. 2008. Chapter 19, section A. Pages 602 to 619. Richard Glover and Peter Murphy. Thirteenth Edition. 2013. Pages 678 to 694.
Adrian Keane and Paul McKeown. "Documentary evidence". The Modern Law of Evidence. Eleventh Edition. Oxford University Press. 2016. Pages 279 to 290. Twelfth Edition. 2018. Pages 285 to 296.
Charanjit Singh Landa and Mohamed Ramjohn. "Documentary evidence". Unlocking Evidence. (Unlocking the Law). Second Edition. Routledge (Taylor & Francis Group). London and New York. Canada. 2013. Section 14.8.1 at page 357 et seq. Third Edition. 2016. Pages 454 to 456.
Christopher Allen. "Documentary Evidence". Practical Guide to Evidence. Fourth Edition. Routledge-Cavendish. London and New York. Canada. 2008. Pages 57 to 61. Second Edition. Cavendish Publishing Limited. 2001. Pages 391 to 396.
W M Best. "Of Documentary Evidence". A Treatise on the Principles of Evidence and Practice as to Proofs in Courts of Common Law. S Sweet. London. 1849. Chapter 3. Pages 238 to 276. "Documents". A Treatise on the Principles of the Law of Evidence. Third Edition. H Sweet. 1860. Part 3. Pages 287 to 337. The Principles of the Law of Evidence. Eighth Edition, by J M Lely and Charles F Chamberlayne. Sweet and Maxwell. London. The Boston Book Co. Boston. 1893. Pages 198 to 239.
Cutler and Griffin. "Written Evidence". Powell's Principles and Practice of the Law of Evidence. Fifth Edition. Butterworths. London. 1885. Part 2. Pages 329 to 466. See also 1892 edition and 1898 edition.
Jonathan Doak and Claire McGourlay. "Documentary evidence". Criminal Evidence in Context. Second Edition. Routledge-Cavendish. 2009. Pages 13 and 14. Jonathan Doak and Claire McGourlay, with Mark Thomas. Evidence in Context. Fourth Edition. Routledge. 2015. Pages 10 and 11.

Evidence law